SET Metro is a television channel of the Sanlih E-Television in Taiwan, launched in September 1995. It mainly broadcasts Taiwanese drama and cartoons.

Productions Drama

Daily

8PM 
Inborn Pair
Ti Amo Chocolate
Sweet Sweet Bodyguard
Lady Maid Maid
Two Fathers
Second Life
Love Family
Fabulous 30
Tie The Knot
Love Cheque Charge
Dear Mom
Be with You
Bitter Sweet
Love or Spend
The Love Song
Better Man
V-Focus
Just for You

9PM 
GUNG HAY FAT CHOY
Love, Now
A Hint of You

Friday

10:30 PM 
Police et vous
Play Ball
The Year of Happiness and Love
Lucky Days
Ni Yada
The Fierce Wife
Soldier

8PM 
Love Me or Leave Me
Big Red Riding Hood

10PM 
Just You
In a Good Way
Pleasantly Surprised
Aim High
Murphy's Law of Love
Love Cuisine
Back to 1989
Swimming Battle
The Perfect Match

Saturday 
Lavender
My MVP Valentine
At Dolphin Bay
Westside Story
Snow Angel
Top on the Forbidden City
La robe de mariée des cieux
MR. FIGHTING
The Prince Who Turns into a Frog
Green Forest, My Home
Magicians of Love
Smiling Pasta
Engagement for Love
My Lucky Star
My Best Pals
Bull Fighting
Fated to Love You
Invincible Shan Bao Mei
My Queen
Easy Fortune Happy Life
Autumn's Concerto
PS Man
JHONG WU YAN
Channel-X
Love You
Office Girls
Love Forward
Miss Rose
King Flower
Love Around
Déjà Vu
Fall in Love with Me
I do²
Someone Like You
When I See You Again
Bromance
Refresh Man
Prince of Wolf
Behind Your Smile
The Masked Lover
Lost Romance

Others 
100% Senorita
Taipei Family (Season 2-3) (See Taipei Family)
Wang's Class Reunion
Be With Me

External links
 SET Metro official website

1995 establishments in Taiwan
Television stations in Taiwan
Television channels and stations established in 1995
Sanlih E-Television